Couy is a commune in the Cher department in the Centre-Val de Loire region of France.

Geography
The river Vauvise flows northeastward through the eastern part of the commune.

Population

Sights
 The church of St. Martin, dating from the thirteenth century.
 The eighteenth-century manorhouse at Creu.

See also
Communes of the Cher department

References

Communes of Cher (department)